Gemmula rotata is an extinct species of sea snail, a marine gastropod mollusk in the family Turridae, the turrids.

Description

Distribution
Fossils of this marine species have been found in Pliocene strata in Provence-Alpes-Côte d'Azur, France.

References

 Chirli (C.) & Richard (C.), 2008 Les Mollusques plaisanciens de la Côte d’Azur, p. 1-128

rotata
Gastropods described in 1814